Haiku from Zero is the fifth studio album by Australian electronic music band Cut Copy. It was released on 22 September 2017 by Cutters Records and Astralwerks. The album was produced by Dan Whitford and Ben H. Allen. It spawned three singles: "Airborne", "Standing in the Middle of the Field" and "Black Rainbows".

Background
Cut Copy worked on the album between 2014 and 2016, mostly remotely, using online file sharing to exchange ideas, due to the band members' dispersion to distant locations (Dan in Europe, Tim and Ben in the United States, and Mitchell in Australia). They would eventually get together in 2015 to record the new material in a studio in Atlanta, Georgia. The band was joined by Ben H. Allen with whom they had already worked on Zonoscope and who would end up as the producer of the album this time around. Dan Whitford said: "This is the first time we've gone into a recording studio and followed a traditional recording process in making an album".

In January 2016, the band took a break from working on the album, and instead recorded an instrumental ambient material in about 10 days. It was released as January Tape in September 2016 as a limited cassette run of 400 copies. In October, Dan Whitford revealed that the new album was about three quarters complete.

As opposed to every previous Cut Copy album, interludes between songs are absent on Haiku from Zero.

Release and promotion
"Airborne" was released as the lead single from the album on 6 July 2017, followed by its music video on 20 July. The album's title and release date was announced on 10 August 2017, alongside the release of the next single "Standing in the Middle of the Field".

On 14 September, the album was made available for streaming on NPR's website, before being officially released worldwide on 22 September. "Black Rainbows" subsequently served as the third single from the album. Music video for "Standing in the Middle of the Field" premiered in October.

The band embarked on a tour across North America and Australia to support the album.

Reception

Haiku from Zero received mixed to favourable reviews from professional music critics upon its initial release. At Metacritic, which assigns a normalised rating out of 100 to reviews from mainstream publications, the album received an average score of 62, based on 14 reviews, indicating "generally positive reviews". At AnyDecentMusic?, it scored 6.7 out of 10 points, based on 12 reviews.

In his review for AllMusic, Tim Sendra described Haiku from Zero as the band's "most straightforward, easy-to-swallow album yet", but also reflected that it is missing "inspiration or invention, which also means it is their least successful record yet as well."

Reviewer Rudy K. of Sputnikmusic described the album's energy as "impressive; the craft, even more so", but complained that it does not have "any sense of vision", summing it up as "a bunch of great songs and little else".

In a review for Exclaim!, Cam Lindsay praised the album as "another strong effort by a band that continue to celebrate the power of dance music".

Track listing

Personnel
Credits adapted from the liner notes of Haiku from Zero.

 Will Alexander – studio assistance
 Ben H. Allen – mixing, production
 Andrew Belanger – studio assistance
 Jordan Bridges – studio assistance
 Ben Etter – engineering, mixing assistance
 Jason Kingsland – engineering, vocal production
 Kegan Krogh – studio assistance
 Joe LaPorta – mastering
 Anthony Prince – studio assistance
 Dennis Schröder – studio assistance
 Tom Teters – photography
 Tommy Urbie – studio assistance
 Dan Whitford – artwork, production, vocals

Charts

Release history

References

2017 albums
Astralwerks albums
Cut Copy albums